The 1994–95 season was the 93rd in the history of the Western Football League.

The league champions for the second time in their history (and the second season running) were Tiverton Town. The champions of Division One were Brislington.

Final tables

Premier Division
The Premier Division remained at 18 clubs after Exmouth Town and Minehead were relegated to the First Division. Two clubs joined:

Barnstaple Town, champions of the First Division.
Bridport, runners-up in the First Division.

First Division
The First Division was increased from 20 clubs to 21, after Barnstaple Town and Bridport were promoted to the Premier Division, and Ottery St Mary and Radstock Town left the league. Five new clubs joined:

Amesbury Town, promoted from the Wiltshire County League.
Bridgwater Town, promoted from the Somerset Senior League – rejoining the league after leaving in 1982.
Exmouth Town, relegated from the Premier Division.
Melksham Town, promoted from the Wiltshire County League – rejoining the league after leaving in 1993.
Minehead, relegated from the Premier Division.

References

1994-95
6